The levator ani nerve is a nerve to the levator ani muscles. It originates from sacral spinal nerve 4.

References

Nerves of the lower limb and lower torso